The steamboat City of Shelton operated in the 1890s and early 1900s as part of the Puget Sound Mosquito Fleet.

Construction
City of Shelton was built in 1895 at Shelton, Washington, to replace Willie on the Olympia-Shelton route.  She was 99.8 feet long, 20.5 on the beam, with a 6' depth of hold, and rated at 190 tons.  City of Shelton was one of the few vessels built on the Sound at that time because an economic depression had driven down business.

Operations
One of her competitors was Marion, a small propeller-driven steamboat with an award-winning triple expansion engine.  Marion'''s crew derisively named City of Shelton "Old Wet-Butt" after the spray thrown up on her deck by her unguarded sternwheel.  During one race, when Marion was running at full speed, her shaft broke, and she had to whistle for assistance to City of Shelton who towed her into Olympia.City of Shelton once ran aground at Arcadia Point in a fog.  While waiting for the tide to come in and float her off, the cook had himself lowered overboard in a bosun's chair and came back with three huge geoduck clams, weighing a total of 12 pounds, which he made into chowder.  Newell describes the reaction of the rest of the crew:

In March 1905, following the recent loss of the steamer Clallam in the Strait of Juan de Fuca, steamboat inspectors cracked down and levied heavy fines against a number of steamboats on Puget Sound for inadequate safety equipment, including the City of Shelton, fined for having no signs advising passengers of life preservers, and no log of boat or fire drills."Three Fines Assessed Yesterday on Vessels", Port Townsend Leader, March 15, 1905, page 2, col.2  Her original fine of $500 (a lot of money for the time) was later reduced to $10, presumably as a result of curing the safety defects.City of Shelton ran on the Olympia-Shelton run until 1907, when the Shelton Transportation Co. replaced her with S.G. Simpson. City of Shelton's last skipper on the regular route was Capt. Ed Gustafson, who with mate Ole Gustafson and engineer John Lesli took over the new sternwheeler S.G. Simpson.  City of Shelton was kept on as a reserve boat until about 1912, when she was sold to the American Tug Boat Co., an Everett concern. George E. Barlow (1842-1912) was another captain of City of Shelton.

Abandonment
Her new owners did not put City of Shelton to use, but simply moored her on Dead Water Slough in the Snohomish River with the Edison'' where eventually she fell apart in about 1930.

See also
S.G. Simpson (sternwheeler)

Notes

Steamboats of Washington (state)
1895 ships